() is a municipality and village in Bruntál District in the Moravian-Silesian Region of the Czech Republic. It has about 500 inhabitants.

History
The first written mention of Svobodné Heřmanice is in a deed of Pope Innocent IV from 1250.

Notable people
Šárka Cojocarová (born 1989), model, Czech Miss 2011 winner

References

Villages in Bruntál District